Gillotia is a genus of fungi in the family Mycosphaerellaceae.

The genus name of Gillotia is in honour of François-Xavier Gillot (1842 – 1910), who was a French physician, mycologist and botanist.
.

The genus was circumscribed by Pier Andrea Saccardo and Alessandro Trotter in Syll. Fung. vol.22 on page 253 in 1913.

References

Mycosphaerellaceae genera
Dothideomycetes genera
Taxa named by Pier Andrea Saccardo
Taxa described in 1913